Braj Basi Lal  (2 May 1921 – 10 September 2022) was an Indian writer and archaeologist. He was the Director General of the Archaeological Survey of India (ASI) from 1968 to 1972 and has served as Director of the Indian Institute of Advanced Studies, Shimla. Lal also served on various UNESCO committees. 

His later publications have been noted and criticised for their historical revisionism, taking a controversial stance in the Ayodhya dispute, claiming to have found the remains of a columned Hindu temple beneath the subsequently destroyed Babri Masjid mosque.

He received the Padma Bhushan Award by the President of India in 2000, and was awarded India's second highest civilian award, the Padma Vibhushan, in 2021.

Biography

Personal life
Lal was born in Jhansi, Uttar Pradesh, India, on 2 May 1921. He lived in Delhi and had three sons. The eldest, Rajesh Lal, is a retired Air Vice Marshal, Indian Air Force, His second son Vrajesh Lal and the third, Rakesh Lal, are businessmen based in Los Angeles, California. Lal died at his home in Hauz Khas on 10 September 2022, at the age of 101.

Career
Lal obtained his master's degree in Sanskrit from Allahabad University, India. After his studies, Lal developed interest in archaeology and in 1943, became a trainee in excavation under a veteran British archaeologist, Mortimer Wheeler, starting with Taxila, and later at sites such as Harappa. Lal went on to work as an archaeologist for more than fifty years. In 1968, he was appointed the Director General of the Archaeological Survey of India where he would remain until 1972. Thereafter, Lal served as Director of the Indian Institute of Advanced Studies, Shimla. The B. B. Lal Chair at Indian Institute of Technology, Kanpur (IIT, Kanpur) has been established by his son Vrajesh Lal to encourage research in science and technology related to archaeological work.

Archaeological work
Between 1950 and 1952, Lal worked on the archaeology of sites accounted for in the Hindu epic Mahabharata, including Hastinapura, the capital city of the Kurus. He made discoveries of many Painted Grey Ware (PGW) sites in the Indo‑Gangetic Divide and upper Yamuna‑Ganga doab.

In Nubia, the Archaeological Survey of India, Lal and his team discovered Middle and Late Stone Age tools in the terraces of the river Nile near Afyeh. The team excavated a few sites at Afyeh and cemetery of C-group people, where 109 graves would be located. Lal worked on Mesolithic site of Birbhanpur (West Bengal), Chalcolithic site of Gilund (Rajasthan) and Harappan site of Kalibangan (Rajasthan).

In 1975–76, Lal worked on the "Archaeology of Ramayana Sites" project funded by the ASI, which excavated five sites mentioned in the Hindu epic Ramayana – Ayodhya, Bharadwaj ashram, Nandigram, Chitrakoot and Shringaverapur.

Prof. B. B. Lal has published over 20 books and over 150 research papers and articles in national and international scientific journals. The British archaeologists Stuart Piggott and D.H. Gordon, writing in the 1950s, describe Copper Hoards of the Gangetic Basin (1950) and the Hastinapura Excavation Report (1954–1955), two of Lal's works published in the Journal of the Archaeological Survey of India, as "models of research and excavation reporting." 

In his later publications, Lal has taken a pro-Hindutva stance and engaged in historical revisionism, taking a controversial stance in the Ayodhya dispute, and arguing in favor of the discredited Indigenous Aryans point of view. His later works have been characterized by D. N. Jha as "a systematic abuse of archaeology," while Julian Droogan writes that Lal "has used the term blut und boden [sic], a patriotic connection between one's blood and the soil of one's homeland, in connection with supposed religious continuity in the archaeological record of the subcontinent." R.S.Sharma characterized Lal's later work as driven by communalism and irrationalism, disembedded from "objective and scientific criteria."

Ayodhya dispute 

Lal took a controversial stance in the Ayodhya dispute. Between 1975 and 1980 excavations took place at Ayodhya, with Lal writing in 1977, in the official ASI journal, that finds were "devoid of any special interest." In a seven-page preliminary report submitted to the Archaeological Survey of India (ASI) in 1989, Lal "only mentioned" that his team found "pillar bases," immediately south of the Babri mosque structure in Ayodhya. In 1990, after his retirement, he wrote in a RSS magazine that he had found the remains of a columned temple under the mosque, and "embarked on a spree of lectures all over the country propagating th[is] evidence from Ayodhya." In Lal's 2008 book, Rāma, His Historicity, Mandir and Setu: Evidence of Literature, Archaeology and Other Sciences, he writes (that): 

Lal's conclusions have been contested by multiple scholars, questioning both the stratigraphic information and the kind of structure envisioned by Lal. According to Hole, 
 
Hole concludes that "the structural elements he had previously thought insignificant suddenly became temple foundations only in order to manufacture support for the nationalists' cause."{{refn|group=note|In 2003 another excavation took place, in which, according to the ASI report, 50 pillars of a huge structure were found, "indicative" of a temple. K. K. Muhammad, member of the 1976–1977 excavation team, "maintains that there is enough archaeological proof of a grand temple below the Babri Mosque," stating that "more than 50 pillar bases in 17 rows were exposed," according to him remains of "a temple below the Babri Mosque and dated back to the 12th century AD." Yet, according to archaeologists Supriya Verma and Menon Shiv Sunni, who observed the excavations on behalf of the Sunni Waqf Board, "the ASI was operating with a preconceived notion of discovering the remains of a temple beneath the demolished mosque, even selectively altering the evidence to suit its hypothesis."<ref>Supriya Verma, Menon Shiv Sunni (2010), [https://www.epw.in/journal/2010/50/verdict-ayodhya-special-issues/was-there-temple-under-babri-masjid-reading Was There a Temple under the Babri Masjid? Reading the Archaeological 'Evidence'''], Economic & Political Weekly</ref> According to Varma, "there is no archaeological evidence that there was a temple under the Babri Masjid," stating that "Underneath the Babri Masjid, there are actually older mosques." According to archaeologist D. Mandal, who was also critical of Lal's stance, although the "pillar bases" appear to be aligned, they are not "pillar bases," and belong to different periods. That is, they had never existed together at any point of time; they were not really in alignment with one another; they were not even pillar bases, but junctions of walls, bases of the load-bearing columns at the intersections of walls.}}

Indigenous Aryanism

In his 2002 book, The Saraswati Flows On, Lal rejected the widely accepted Indo-Aryan migration theory, arguing that the Rig Vedic description of the Sarasvati River as "overflowing" contradicts the mainstream view that the Indo-Aryan migration started at ca. 1500 BCE, after the Sarasvati River had dried up. In his book ‘The Rigvedic People: ‘Invaders’? ‘Immigrants’? or Indigenous?’, Lal argues that the Rigvedic People and the authors of the Harappan civilisation were the same, a view outside mainstream scholarship.

List of publications

 
 Braj Basi Lal. (1956). Paleoliths from Beas and Banganga Valleys. Ancient India. No.12. pp. 58–92.
 Braj Basi Lal. (1958). Birbhanpur: Microlith site in Damodar Valley., West Bengal. Ancient India. No..14. pp 4–40.
 Braj Basi Lal. (1960). From the Megalith to the Harappan: Tracing Back the Graffiti on Pottery, Ancient India. No. 16. Pp 4–24
 Braj Basi Lal. (1962) Indian Archaeological Expedition to Qasr Ibrim (Nubia) 1961–62. 
.
 
 Braj Basi Lal. (1966). The Direction of Writing in the Harappan Script. Antiquity. Vol. .XL. No.175. pp 52–56.
 Braj Basi Lal. (1968). A Deluge? Which Deluge? Yet Another Facet of Copper Hoard Culture. American Anthropologist. Vol. 70. Pp 857–73.
 

 Special survey reports on selected towns: Dumka, 1981.
 Braj Basi Lal. (1982). The Giant Tank of Śṛiṅgaverapura. Illustrated London News. January. P59
 Frontiers of the Indus Civilization'', 1984.

 
 

 
 Braj Basi Lal. (2003). Should One Give up All Ethics for Promoting One's Theory? East and West. Vol. 53. . Nos. 1–4. pp285–88.

 
 
 
 

 Braj Basi Lal. (2013) Historicity of the Mahabharata: Evidence of Art, Literature and Archaeology. Aryan Books International.  (HB), 978-81-7305-459-4 (PB)

 Braj Basi Lal. (2015) Excavations at Kalibangan (1961–69): The Harappans. Archaeological Survey of India.
 Braj Basi Lal. (2017a) Kauśāmbī Revisited Aryan Books International 
 Braj Basi Lal. (2017b) Testing Ancient Traditions on the Touchstone of Archaeology. Aryan Books International
 Braj Basi Lal. (2019)  Agony of an Archaeologist. Aryan Books International.
 BR Mani; Rajesh Lal; Neera Misra; Vinay Kumar (2019) Felicitating a Legendary Archaeology Prof B.B. Lal. Vols. III. BR Publishing Corporation.  (Set of 3 Vols.)
 Braj Basi Lal. (2019). From the Mesolithic to the Mahājanapadas: The Rise of Civilisation in the Ganga Valley. Aryan Books International.

Honors
  Awarded the title of Vidyā Vāridhi by the Nava Nālandā Mahāvihāra, Nālandā University in 1979.
  Awarded the title of Mahāhopādhyāya by Mithila Vishwavidyalaya in 1982
  Honorary Fellowship for Life, Asiatic Society of Bengal, 1991
 D. Litt. (Honoris Causa) by St. Petersburg Academy of Sciences, Russia, 1994
  Awarded the Padma Bhushan by the President of India in 2000
  D. Litt. (Honoris Causa) by the Deccan college, 2014
 Padma Vibhushan in 2021.

See also
 Archaeology of Ayodhya

Notes

References

Sources

Printed sources

Web-sources

Further reading

External links

The Homeland of Indo-European Languages and Culture: Some Thoughts By Archaeologist B.B. Lal
Let not the 19th century paradigms continue to haunt us! Inaugural Address, by Prof. Lal, delivered at the 19th International Conference on South Asian Archaeology, 2007
List of publications at worldcat.org
 Romila Thapar (2019), They Peddle Myths and Call It History
 Prof BB Lal: How the ‘Dean of Indian Archaeology’ dug out truth on AIT and Ayodhya temple (firstpost.com)

1921 births
2022 deaths
Indian centenarians
Men centenarians
20th-century Indian archaeologists
Directors General of the Archaeological Survey of India
20th-century Indian non-fiction writers
21st-century Indian non-fiction writers
Recipients of the Padma Bhushan in science & engineering
People from Jhansi
University of Allahabad alumni
Indian Indologists
Analysts of Ayodhya dispute
Indigenous Aryanists
Scientists from Uttar Pradesh
People associated with the Indus Valley civilisation
Indian institute directors
Archaeologists of South Asia